Logan is a surname.

Notable people with the surname "Logan" include

A
Abraham Logan (1816–1873), English lawyer and editor
Adam Logan (born 1975), Canadian mathematician
Adella Hunt Logan (1863–1915), American writer
Adrian Logan (born 1955), Northern Irish television presenter
Alastair Logan, English lecturer
Alec Logan (1882–1918), Scottish footballer
Alexander Logan (1841–1894), Canadian politician
Ana Rivas Logan (born 1961), American politician
Andrew Logan (disambiguation), multiple people
Andy Logan (1918–1998), American football player
Archibald Logan (1865–1940), New Zealand yacht designer
Arthur Logan (disambiguation), multiple people
Aubrey Logan (born 1988), American singer

B
Bellina Logan (born 1966), American actress
Benjamin Logan (1742–1802), American pioneer
Benjamin F. Logan (1927–2015), American engineer
Bennie Logan (born 1989), American football player
Bob Logan (disambiguation), multiple people
Boone Logan (born 1984), American baseball player
Brad Logan, American guitarist
Bruce Logan (disambiguation), multiple people

C
Cammy Logan (born 2002), Scottish footballer
Campbell Logan (1910–1978), British television producer
Captain Logan (1776–1812), Native American warrior
Carlos Logan (born 1985), English footballer
Carolyn Logan (born 1957), American politician
Carrie Steele Logan (1829–1900), American philanthropist
Celia Logan (1837–1904), American actress
Charles Logan (disambiguation), multiple people
Coley Logan (1912–1999), American baseball player
Conrad Logan (born 1986), Irish footballer
Cornelius Logan (disambiguation), multiple people
Craig Logan (born 1969), Scottish music manager
Crawford Logan, British actor

D
Dan Logan (born 1985), English musician
Daniel Logan (born 1987), New Zealand actor
Dasha Logan (born 1987), Malaysian singer-songwriter
David Logan (disambiguation), multiple people
Deborah Norris Logan (1761–1839), American historian
Devin Logan (born 1993), American skier
Dick Logan (disambiguation), multiple people
Don Logan (disambiguation), multiple people
Donald Logan (1917–2009), British diplomat
Doug Logan (born 1943), American sports executive

E
Eddie Logan (1910–2009), American baseball player
Edward Lawrence Logan (1875–1939), American politician
Eileen Logan (1930–2015), English lawn bowler
Eliza Logan (1827–1872), American actress
Elle Logan (born 1987), American rower
Ella Logan (1913–1969), Scottish-American actress and singer
Emma Logan (born 1997), Canadian curler
Ernie Logan (born 1968), American football player

F
F. Donald Logan (1930–2022), American historian
Feargal Logan, Irish Gaelic football player
Fran Logan (born 1956), Australian politician
Freddy Logan (1930–2003), English musician

G
Gabby Logan (born 1973), English television presenter
Gary Logan (born 1971), Scottish curler
George Logan (disambiguation), multiple people
Gerald Logan (1879–1951), English field hockey player
Giuseppi Logan (1935–2020), American musician
Glen Logan (born 1998), American football player
Gordon Logan (born 1949), Scottish footballer
Gordon Logan (psychologist), American psychologist
Grant Logan (born 1980), Scottish lawn bowler
Gregory Logan (born 1963), New Zealand cricketer
Gwendolyn Logan (1881–1967), British-American actress
Guy Murray Logan (1899–1986), Canadian politician

H
Hance James Logan (1869–1944), Canadian lawyer and politician
Harlan D. Logan (??–1994), American politician
Harold Logan (footballer) (1906–1995), Australian rules footballer
Harry Logan (1888–1910), Scottish footballer
Harvey Logan (1867–1904), American outlaw
Helen Logan (1906–1989), American screenwriter
Henry Logan (disambiguation), multiple people
Herschel C. Logan (1901–1987), American artist
Horace Logan (1916–2002), American musician
Hugh Logan (1834–1903), American soldier
Hugh Logan (cricketer) (1885–1919), English cricketer
Hugo Logan (born 1998), English footballer

I
Ian Logan (born 1982), Canadian football player
Irene Logan (born 1994), Liberian-Ghanaian singer-songwriter

J
Jack Logan (disambiguation), multiple people
Jacqueline Logan (1902–1983), American actress
Jake Logan (wrestler) (born 1993), American professional wrestler
James Logan (disambiguation), multiple people
Janice Logan (1915–1965), American actress
Jason Logan, Canadian illustrator
Jeff Logan, American football player
Jennifer Logan, English scientist
Jenny Logan (born 1942), English actress
Jerry Logan (born 1941), American football player
Jim Logan (disambiguation), multiple people
Joe Logan (born 1974), American basketball coach
Joel Logan (born 1995), English footballer
John Logan (disambiguation), multiple people
Johnny Logan (disambiguation), multiple people
Josh Logan (disambiguation), multiple people
Juan Logan (born 1946), American artist
Jud Logan (1959–2022), American hammer thrower

K
Karl Logan (born 1965), American musician
Kenny Logan (born 1972), Scottish rugby union footballer
Kirsty Logan (born 1984), Scottish novelist

L
Lara Logan (born 1971), South African journalist
Leroy Logan (born 1957), English police officer
Les Logan (1908–2000), Australian politician
Lillie Logan (1843–1923), American painter
Lillian Logan, American actress
Lorie K. Logan, American financier

M
Mal Logan (1931–2022), Australian geographer
Marc Logan (born 1965), American football player
Marc Logan (broadcast journalist) (born 1971), Filipino journalist
Mark Logan (disambiguation), multiple people
Martha Daniell Logan (1704–1779), American botanist
Mary Simmerson Cunningham Logan (1838–1923), American writer
Maurice Logan (1886–1977), American artist
Max Logan (1934–2006), Australian rules footballer
Michael Logan (disambiguation), multiple people
M. L. Logan, British rugby union footballer
M. M. Logan (1874–1939), American politician
Myra Adele Logan (1908–1977), American physician

N
Neil Logan (1875–1949), Scottish footballer
Nick Logan (born 1947), English journalist
Nick Logan (baseball) (1896–1975), American baseball player
Nook Logan (born 1979), American baseball player

O
Obert Logan (1941–2003), American football player
Olive Logan (1839–1909), American actress
Oni Logan, Argentine-American singer
Onnie Lee Logan (1910–1995), American midwife

P
Paddy Logan (disambiguation), multiple people
Patrick Logan (1791–1830), English colonist
Paul Logan (disambiguation), multiple people
Peyton Logan (born 1998), American football player
Phyllis Logan (born 1956), Scottish actress
Piper Logan (born 2001), Canadian rugby sevens footballer

R
Randy Logan (born 1951), American football player
Rayford Logan (1897–1982), American historian and activist
Raymond Logan (born 1978), Scottish footballer
Rennie Logan (1928–2003), Scottish lawn bowler
Richard Logan (disambiguation), multiple people
Ricky Dean Logan, American actor
Robert Logan (disambiguation), multiple people
Rodman Logan (1922–2004), Canadian politician
Rodrigo Logan (born 1980), Chilean politician
Ron Logan (1938–2022), American corporate executive
Ross Logan (1909–1993), Scottish rugby union footballer
Rufus Logan, American editor

S
Sadye L. Logan, American academic
Samantha Logan (born 1996), American actress
Samuel Logan (born 1976), American investigative journalist
Samuel T. Logan (born 1943), American theologian
Sarah Logan (born 1993), American professional wrestler
Saxon Logan (born 1956), British-South African director
Scott Logan (disambiguation), multiple people
Sean Logan (born 1970), American politician
Sean D. Logan (born 1966), American politician
Shay Logan (born 1988), English footballer
Stanley Logan (1885–1953), English actor
Stefan Logan (born 1981), American football player
Stephen Logan (disambiguation), multiple people
Steve Logan (born 1980), American basketball player
Steve Logan (American football) (born 1953), American football coach
Steven Paul Logan (born 1965), American judge

T
Thomas Logan (disambiguation), multiple people
Tip Logan (1927–2007), Canadian football player
T. J. Logan (born 1994), American football player
Tom Logan (disambiguation), multiple people
Tommy Logan (1888–1862), Scottish footballer
Trevon Logan, American economist

V
Veronica Logan (born 1969), Italian actress
Vincent Logan (1941–2021), Scottish bishop

W
Wayne Logan, American author
Wendell Logan (1940–2010), American musician
Wenonah Bond Logan (1906–1993), American sociologist
W. H. Logan, American politician
William Logan (disambiguation), multiple people
Willie Logan (born 1957), American politician
Winifred W. Logan (1931–2010), British nurse
W. Turner Logan (1874–1941), American politician

Y
Yohanna Logan (born 1975), American fashion designer

Z
Zachari Logan (born 1980), Canadian visual artist

Fictional characters 
Brooke Logan, a character on the soap opera The Bold and the Beautiful
Donna Logan, a character on the soap opera The Bold and the Beautiful
Hope Logan, a character on the soap opera The Bold and the Beautiful
Katie Logan, a character on the soap opera The Bold and the Beautiful
Martha Logan, a character on the television series 24

See also
Logan (disambiguation), a disambiguation page for "Logan"
Logan (given name), a page for people with the given name "Logan"
General Logan (disambiguation), a disambiguation page for Generals surnamed "Logan"
Senator Logan (disambiguation), a disambiguation page for Senators surnamed "Logan"

English-language surnames